The men's snowboard cross competition of the FIS Freestyle Ski and Snowboarding World Championships 2017 was held at Sierra Nevada, Spain on March 10 (qualifying)  and March 12 (finals). 
54 athletes from 22 countries competed.

Qualification
The following are the results of the qualification.

Elimination round
The following are the results of the elimination round.

1/8 Finals

The top 48 qualifiers advanced to the 1/8 finals. From here, they participated in six-person elimination races, with the top three from each race advancing. 

Heat 1

Heat 2

Heat 3

Heat 4

Heat 5

Heat 6

Heat 7

Heat 8

Quarterfinals

Heat 1

Heat 2

Heat 3

Heat 4

Semifinals

Heat 1

Heat 2

Finals

Small Finals

Big Finals

References

Snowboard cross, men's